The Social Credit-NZ party was a political party in New Zealand which split from the New Zealand Democratic Party in 1988.

History
In 1986 the Social Credit Party changed its name to the Democratic Party. Many activists in the party were uneasy with the rebranding, fearing that the party would jettison the social credit monetary policies that had always been central to the party since its creation in 1953.

In July 1988 former Social Credit Party leader Bruce Beetham established Social Credit-NZ after coming to the belief that the Democratic Party was no longer a true social credit based party. Beetham and party president Alan Shaw said the new party would offer an alternative to interventionist and free-market policies by resurrecting original social credit economic ideas. Few rated the party as having much chance of electoral success and media were quick to compare it with the New Democratic Party, a previous splinter social credit party in 1972, which quickly vanished. At the 1990 election the party fielded 68 candidates and won 17,897 votes, only 0.98% of the total compared to the Democrats' 30,455 (1.67%).

In March 1991 Beetham retired from the leadership of the party. Beetham remained the party spokesperson on finance. Shaw also resigned as president and was replaced with Heather Maloney. As leader Hine attempted to conciliate with the Democrats, even going as far as to join the Democratic Party to negotiate a merger. His application for membership was treated with suspicion by the Democrats however. Hine resigned as leader after just nine months; he announced his resignation on 13 November 1991, called for reunification with the Democrats and announced he would remain a member only of the Democrats. Beetham resumed the leadership of the party which continued on as more of pressure group organisation dedicated to furthering Social Credit monetary aims and financial principles.

Eventually the remaining members of the party ended up as part of a supposedly centrist party known as the New Zealand Coalition after joining together with the remnants of the New Zealand Party and the United NZ Party.

In 2018 the Democratic Party changed its name back to the Social Credit Party.

Electoral results

The party also fielded a candidate at the 1992 Tamaki by-election, Colin Maloney, who won 34 votes (0.2%).  After the 1993 merger, a social crediter, Kieron Daok, was the New Zealand Coalition candidate in the 1994 Selwyn by-election. Daok finished 10th out of 11 candidates with 10 votes (or 0.05% of the vote).

See also
Social Credit Party (New Zealand)

References

 
Defunct political parties in New Zealand
Social credit parties
Political parties established in 1988
Political parties disestablished in 1993
Single-issue political parties in New Zealand